Pronectria is a genus of fungi in the family Bionectriaceae. It consists of 44 species, all of which are lichenicolous. The genus was circumscribed by American plant ecologist Frederic Clements in 1931.

Species
Pronectria algicola 
Pronectria angulospora 
Pronectria anisospora 
Pronectria biglobosa 
Pronectria caloplacae 
Pronectria casaresii 
Pronectria collematis 
Pronectria dillmaniae 
Pronectria diplococca 
Pronectria echinulata 
Pronectria erythrinella 
Pronectria fragmospora 
Pronectria hymeniicola 
Pronectria invisibilis 
Pronectria japonica 
Pronectria lecideicola 
Pronectria leptaleae 
Pronectria leptogii 
Pronectria lichenicola 
Pronectria microspora 
Pronectria minuta 
Pronectria neofissuriprodiens 
Pronectria occulta 
Pronectria oligospora 
Pronectria parmotrematis 
Pronectria pedemontana 
Pronectria pertusariicola 
Pronectria pilosa 
Pronectria pycnidioidea 
Pronectria rhizocarpicola 
Pronectria robergei 
Pronectria rolfiana 
Pronectria roseopunctata 
Pronectria santessonii 
Pronectria sticticola 
Pronectria tenacis 
Pronectria tenuispora 
Pronectria terrestris 
Pronectria tibellii 
Pronectria tincta 
Pronectria toniniae 
Pronectria verrucariae 
Pronectria walkerorum 
Pronectria xanthoriae 
Pronectria zhurbenkoi

References

Hypocreales genera
Bionectriaceae
Lichenicolous fungi
Taxa described in 1931
Taxa named by Frederic Clements